The Triumph Renown  is strictly the name given to the Triumph's large saloon car made from 1949 to 1954 but it is, in reality, part of a three-car series of the 1800, 2000 and Renown models. Together with the Triumph Roadster, they were the first vehicles to carry the Triumph badge following the company's takeover by the Standard Motor Company.

The Triumph Razoredge Owner's Club Ltd, formed in 1975, provides support to some of the remaining Razoredge saloons. The Club is unable to supply Triumph parts the USA and Canada due to insurance costs of supplying North America. 

As of 2016, the Club knows of around 250 of these cars distributed worldwide. The later two series of cars with chassis numbers commencing TDB and TDC have survived better than the earlier two variants. This may be due to the commonality of most of the mechanical parts with the Standard Vanguard which was produced during the same period.  
These cars provide an elegant sedate motoring experience. Those that were fitted with the Laycock de Normanville overdrive are able to cruise at around 55 to 60 MPH and return a fuel consumption of about 25 to 27 MPG.

Bodywork
The cars were distinctively styled in the later 1930s vogue for Razor Edge coachwork used in the 1940s by others including Austin for its big Sheerline. The six light (featuring three side windows on each side) design and the thin C pillars at the rear of the passenger cabin anticipated the increased window areas that would become a feature of British cars during the 1960s. The car's side profile resembled that of the contemporary prestigious Bentley saloons, which some felt was more than a coincidence. Similar styling subsequently appeared on the smaller Triumph Mayflower. The Managing Director of the Standard Motor Company at that time, Sir John Black, commissioned the design of the Razoredge saloon. There has been much discussion over the years as to exactly which designers of that period were responsible for the styling but it is very clear from the records that Sir John drove the production forward and used the Triumph name from the prewar Triumph company that had been bought by the Standard Motor Company.

The body was built by Mulliners of Birmingham in the traditional coachbuilder's method of sheet metal over a wooden frame. The principal panels were constructed not from steel, which was in short supply in the wake of the Second World War, but from aluminium. It had been used extensively for aircraft manufacture during the war, which had taken place in a number of car plants (known at the time as "shadow factories") in the English Midlands.  But by the mid-1950s aluminium had become the more expensive metal, which may have hastened the Renown's demise.

Triumph 1800 Town & Country Saloon 1946–49

The 1776 cc,  engine and the gearbox for the 1800 came from the pre-war Standard Flying Fourteen (also built 1945-1948). The chassis was fabricated from tubular steel and was a lengthened  version of the one on the Roadster with which it also shared its transverse leaf spring front suspension. The cars were well fitted out with leather seats and a wooden dashboard.

A total of 4000 were produced. It cost £1425 including purchase tax.

Triumph 2000 TDA 1949

The 2000 Type TDA was only produced for one year and was essentially a Triumph 1800. The front independent suspension used a transverse leaf spring.

The car used the larger 2088 cc four-cylinder engine with single Solex carburettor as fitted to the Standard Vanguard. The engine developed  at 4200 rpm. The 3-speed gearbox with column shift also came from the Vanguard and had synchromesh on all the forward ratios. There was independent suspension at the front but a solid axle and half-elliptic leaf springs was at the rear.  Lockheed hydraulic brakes with  drums were fitted.

2000 were produced.

Triumph Renown Mk I TDB 1949–52
The car was renamed the Renown in October 1949. It had an entirely new chassis based on the Standard Vanguard with pressed steel sections replacing the tubes previously used. The front suspension changed to coil springing. Although the 3-speed column change transmission was retained, from June 1950 an overdrive unit was offered as an option. Inside there was a new instrument layout.

The test car cost £991 including taxes.

Of the 6501 produced, fewer than 100 are known to have survived.

Triumph Renown Limousine 1951–54 

(188 in 1952; 3 in 1953; 3 in 1954)

In 1951 a limousine version was announced with an extra  in the wheelbase. A division (glass partition) was placed behind the driver separating the front and back of the car. A radio and heater were fitted as standard.

A limousine with overdrive tested by The Motor magazine in 1952 had a top speed of  slightly quicker than they had recorded two years earlier for the saloon and could accelerate from 0– in 25.0 seconds. The test car cost £1440 including taxes.

A total of 190 were made though only very small numbers remain.

Triumph Renown Mk II TDC 1952–54
The final version of the Renown used the longer-wheelbase chassis from the limousine. It is easily distinguished from the earlier cars by virtue of the push button door handles and the wider rear window.

Of the 2800 produced, only 150 remain worldwide.

Demise and replacement

There was no direct replacement Triumph saloon following the end of Renown production. A badge-engineered version of the Standard Vanguard Phase III intended to be called the Triumph Renown was built with a version of the upright Triumph radiator grille and the Triumph "world" badges, but shortly before the model's launch in August 1956 it was decided to badge it as the Standard Vanguard Sportsman instead.

Die-cast models

 Dinky Toys modelled the Renown in 1:48 scale in the 1950s.
 Lansdowne produced a model in the first decade of the 21st century.

References

External links
 Previoius incarnation: Alvis Silver Crest 1936 - 1940
Triumph Razoredge Owners club

Renown
1950s cars
Cars introduced in 1949